Teresa Pike Tomlinson (born February 19, 1965) is an American politician and attorney. A member of the Democratic Party, she was elected and served as the 69th Mayor of Columbus, Georgia in 2010. On January 3, 2011, she was sworn in as the city's first female mayor.

On May 20, 2014, she was re-elected to a second term with 62% of the vote, making her the first Mayor since the city's consolidation in 1971 to win re-election in a contested race.

Early life and education 
Tomlinson is a 1983 graduate of Chamblee High School in Atlanta, Georgia. She earned a Bachelor of Arts degree from Sweet Briar College in Virginia and a Juris Doctor from the Emory University School of Law.

Career

Legal and Philanthropic Work 
Tomlinson worked as an attorney at the firm Pope, McGlamry, Kilpatrick, Morrison and Norwood for sixteen years, and eventually became the firm's first female partner. She served as Executive Director of MidTown, Inc., a non-profit community renewal organization, from 2006 until 2010.

In 2015, after the announcement of the potential closure of her undergraduate alma mater, Sweet Briar College, Tomlinson and other alumnae raised $28.5 million in order to fulfill the terms of a court approved settlement, which prevented the college from closing. She was a primary witness in the court case that was successful before the Virginia Supreme Court and was involved in discussions with the Virginia Attorney General's Office regarding the saving of the college.

On January 7, 2019, Tomlinson joined the law firm Hall Booth Smith, P.C., as a partner specializing in complex litigation, crisis management and strategic solutions.

Political Career 
During her tenure, Columbus, Georgia, was named one of the top fifty Best-Run Cities in America in both 2016 and 2017. Her administration reduced crime by 39.3% from its height in 2009, including a 41.2% drop in property crime and a 15% drop in violent crime. Under her leadership, the Columbus Consolidated Government balanced the budget for the first time in 16 years using no reserve funds and provided city and county services at the prudent cost of $1,300 per person. Tomlinson instituted reform in the city's pension plan, saving taxpayers some $39 million and increasing funding of the General Government plan to over 90%, while preserving the valuable Defined Benefit Plan for Employees. Reform was also instituted at the Muscogee County Prison with the Rapid Resolution Initiative, which expedited the disposition of unindicted inmates at the Muscogee County Jail. Tax Allocation Districts were adopted to encourage the revitalization of city districts, including City Village and the Liberty District. New biking/walking trails were constructed, known as the Dragonfly Trails, to create 60 miles of connected trails throughout the city, including trails and streetscapes in previously blighted areas. Over two miles of the Chattahoochee River were returned to its natural state, creating the world's longest Whitewater Course in an urban setting. Tomlinson has overseen the renaissance of the city's downtown creating a dining and entertainment district, known as Uptown.

Tomlinson has written opinion pieces for The Daily Beast and The Atlanta Journal-Constitution.

Tomlinson completed her second term on January 6, 2019. Tomlinson ran in the Democratic primary to challenge incumbent Senator David Perdue in the 2020 election but lost to Jon Ossoff who later won the runoff election against Perdue.

Personal life 
She moved to Columbus in 1994 from Atlanta and married Wade "Trip" Tomlinson, who was raised in Columbus.

References

External links

1965 births
21st-century American women politicians
Emory University alumni
Georgia (U.S. state) Democrats
Georgia (U.S. state) lawyers
Living people
Mayors of Columbus, Georgia
Politicians from Atlanta
Women mayors of places in Georgia (U.S. state)
21st-century American politicians
Candidates in the 2020 United States Senate elections